The Zimbabwe national cricket team toured Sri Lanka in January 1998 and played a two-match Test series against the Sri Lanka national cricket team followed by three Limited Overs Internationals (LOI). Sri Lanka won both Test matches to take the series 2–0. Sri Lanka were captained by Arjuna Ranatunga and Zimbabwe by Alistair Campbell. Sri Lanka won the LOI series 3-0.

Test series summary

1st Test

2nd Test

ODI series summary

1st ODI

2nd ODI

3rd ODI

1998 in Sri Lankan cricket
1998 in Zimbabwean cricket
International cricket competitions from 1997–98 to 2000
1997-98
Sri Lankan cricket seasons from 1972–73 to 1999–2000